The geometry and topology of three-manifolds is a set of widely circulated but unpublished notes by William Thurston from 1978 to 1980 describing his work on 3-manifolds. The notes introduced several new ideas into geometric topology, including orbifolds, pleated manifolds, and train tracks.

Distribution

Copies of the original 1980 notes were circulated by  Princeton University. Later the Geometry Center at the University of Minnesota sold a loosely bound copy of the notes. In 2002, Sheila Newbery typed the notes in TeX and made a PDF file of the notes available, which can be downloaded from MSRI using the links below. The book  is an expanded version of the first three chapters of the notes.

Contents

Chapters 1 to 3 mostly describe basic background material on hyperbolic geometry.

Chapter 4 cover Dehn surgery on hyperbolic manifolds

Chapter 5 covers results related to Mostow's theorem on rigidity 

Chapter 6 describes Gromov's invariant and his proof of Mostow's theorem.

Chapter 7 (by Milnor) describes the Lobachevsky function and its applications to computing volumes of hyperbolic 3-manifolds. 

Chapter 8 on Kleinian groups introduces Thurston's work on train track and pleated manifolds

Chapter 9 covers convergence of Kleinian groups and hyperbolic manifolds.

Chapter 10 does not exist.

Chapter 11 covers deformations of Kleinian groups.

Chapter 12 does not exist.

Chapter 13 introduces orbifolds.

References

Hyperbolic geometry
3-manifolds
Kleinian groups